Maharashtra is a state in the western region of India. It is India's second-most populous state and third-largest state by area. The region that comprises the state has a long history dating back to ca. 1300–700 BCE, although the present-day state was not established until 1960 CE.

Prior to Indian independence, notable dynasties and entities that ruled the region include, in chronological order, the Maurya, the Western Satraps, the Satavahana dynasty, Rashtrakuta dynasty, Western Chalukyas, the Bahamanis, Deccan sultanates, Mughals, the Maratha Empire founded by Chhatrapati Shivaji Maharaj, and the British. Ruins, monuments, tombs, forts, and places of worship left by these rulers are dotted around the state. At the time of the Indian independence movement in the early 20th century, along with British ruled areas of Bombay presidency, and Central Provinces and Berar. The region included many British vassal states. Among these, the erstwhile Hyderabad state was the largest and extended over many modern Indian states. Other states grouped under Deccan States Agency included Kolhapur, Miraj, Sangli, Aundh, Bhor, and Sawantwadi.

After independence from the British in 1947, the state of Maharashtra was formed in 1960 after a campaign to create a Marathi-speaking state in the 1950s.

From the 4th century BC until 875, Maharashtri Prakrit and its dialects were the dominant languages of the region. The Marathi language, which evolved from Maharashtri Prakrit, has been the common language since the 9th century. The oldest stone inscriptions in the Marathi language date to around 975 AD, and can be seen in the Jain temple at Shravanabelgola in modern-day Karnataka at the foot of the Lord Bahubali statue.

Early history

Chalcolithic sites belonging to the Jorwe culture (ca. 1300–700 BCE) have been discovered throughout the state. The largest settlement discovered of the culture is at Daimabad, a Late Harappan site, which had a mud fortification during this period, as well as an elliptical temple with fire pits. Some settlements show evidence of planning in the layout of rectangular houses and streets or lanes. In the Late Harappan period there was a large migration of people from Gujarat to northern Maharashtra.

Maharashtra was historically the name of a region which consisted of Aparanta, Vidarbha, Mulak, Assaka (Asmaka) and Kuntala. In ancient times tribal communities of Bhil people inhabited this area, also known as Dandakaranya. There was also an ancient race called "Rattha" ( in Marathi), who referred to themselves as "Maharattha" (Maha is Great). The name Maharashtra first appeared in the 7th century in the account of a contemporary Chinese traveler, Huan Tsang.

Linguists and archeologists believe it is likely Maharashtra was inhabited by Dravidian speakers during the middle Rigvedic period, which is determined from Dravidian place names in Maharashtra. Maharashtra region later became part of the Maurya Empire with edicts of emperor Ashoka found in the region. Buddhism flourished during this period. Trade, including international trade with Greeks and later with the Roman empire, also flourished, with traders being the main patrons of Buddhist monasteries. Indo-Sythian Western Satraps ruled part of the region during the early part of the first millennium.

Middle Kingdoms (200 BCE-13th century CE)
The region that is present-day Maharashtra has formed part of a number of states, including the Maurya empire, Satavahana dynasty, the Kadamba dynasty, the Vakataka dynasty, the Chalukya dynasty and the Rashtrakuta dynasty. Most of these empires extended over large swathes of Indian territory. Some of the greatest monuments in Maharashtra, such as the Ajanta Caves and Ellora Caves, were built during the time of these empires.

Classical period (c. 200 BCE – c. 650 CE)
Maharashtra was ruled by the Maurya Empire in the 4th and 3rd century BCE. Around 230 BCE, it was taken over by the Satavahana dynasty, which ruled the region for the next 400 years. A notable ruler of the Satavahana dynasty was Gautamiputra Satakarni, who defeated Scythian invaders. The Vakataka dynasty ruled from approximately 250 to 470 CE.

The Satavahana dynasty mainly used the Prakrit language on their coins and for inscriptions on the walls of Buddhist monasteries.

The Chalukya and Rashtrakuta

From the 6th century CE to the 8th century, the Chalukya dynasty ruled Maharashtra. Two prominent rulers were Pulakeshin II, who defeated the north Indian Emperor Harsha, and Vikramaditya II, who defeated Arab invaders in the 8th century. The Rashtrakuta Dynasty ruled Maharashtra from the 8th to the 10th century. The Arab traveler Sulaiman called the ruler of the Rashtrakuta Dynasty (Amoghavarsha) "one of the 4 great kings of the world". The Chalukya dynasty and Rashtrakuta dynasty had their capitals in modern-day Karnataka and used Kannada and Sanskrit as court languages.

From the early 11th century to the 12th century the Deccan Plateau, including a large part of Maharashtra, was dominated by the Western Chalukya Empire and the Chola dynasty. Several battles over the Deccan Plateau were fought between these empires during the reigns of Raja Raja Chola I, Rajendra Chola I, Jayasimha II, Someshvara I and Vikramaditya VI.

Between 800 and 1200 CE, parts of Western Maharashtra, including the Konkan region of Maharashtra, were ruled by different Shilahara houses based in North Konkan, South Konkan, and Kolhapur respectively. At different periods in their history, the Shilaharas served as the vassals of either the Rashtrakutas or the Chalukyas.

Yadav dynasty 12th-14th century

The Yadavas of Devagiri dynasty at its peak ruled a kingdom stretching from the Tungabhadra to the Narmada rivers, including present-day Maharashtra, north Karnataka and parts of Madhya Pradesh. Its capital was at Devagiri (present-day Daulatabad in modern Maharashtra). The Yadavas initially ruled as feudatories of the Western Chalukyas.

The founder of the Suena dynasty was Dridhaprahara, the son of Subahu. It is unclear where his capital was located; some argue that his capital was Shrinagara, while an early inscription suggests that Chandradityapura (modern Chandwad in the Nasik district) was the capital. The name Seuna comes from Dridhaprahara's son, Seunachandra, who originally ruled a region called Seunadesha (present-day Khandesh). Bhillama II, a later ruler in the dynasty, assisted Tailapa II in his war with the Paramara king Vakpati Munja. Seunachandra II helped Vikramaditya VI in gaining his throne.

Around the middle of the 12th century, as Chalukya power waned, the Yadavas declared independence. Their rule reached its peak under Singhana II. The Yadavas of Devagiri used Marathi as their court language. Sanskrit was used as a court language by earlier Yadava rulars. Simhana started using Marathi as official court Language. The Yadava capital Devagiri became a magnet for learned scholars in Marathi to showcase and find patronage for their skills. The origin and growth of Marathi literature is directly linked with the rise of the Yadava dynasty.

According to scholars such as George Moraes, V. K. Rajwade, C. V. Vaidya, A.S. Altekar, D. R. Bhandarkar, and J. Duncan M. Derrett, the Seuna rulers were of Maratha descent. Digambar Balkrishna Mokashi noted that the Yadava dynasty "seems to be the first true Maratha empire".

Medieval and Early modern period (1206-1858 CE)

In the early 14th century, the Yadava dynasty, which ruled most of present-day Maharashtra, was overthrown by the Delhi Sultanate ruler Ala-ud-din Khalji. Later, Muhammad bin Tughluq conquered parts of the Deccan, and temporarily shifted his capital from Delhi to Daulatabad in Maharashtra.

Bahmani and Deccan Sultanates 
 
After the collapse of the Tughluqs in 1347, the breakaway Bahmani Sultanate governed the region as well as the wider Deccan region for the next 150 years from Gulbarga and later from Bidar.
The early period of Islamic rule saw atrocities such as imposition of Jizya tax on non-Muslims, temple destruction and forcible conversions. Eventually these incidents largely ceased. For most of this period Brahmins were in charge of accounts, whereas revenue collection was in the hands of Marathas who had  (hereditary rights) of patilki (revenue collection at village level) and deshmukhi (revenue collection over a larger area). A number of families such as Shinde, Bhosale, Shirke, Ghorpade, Jadhav, More, Mahadik, Ghatge and Nimbalkar loyally served different sultans at different periods in time. Since most of the population was Hindu and spoke Marathi, even sultans such as Ibrahim Adil Shah I adopted Marathi as the court language, for administration and record keeping.

After the break-up of the Bahamani sultanate in 1518, the Maharashtra region was split between five Deccan Sultanates: Nizamshah of Ahmadnagar Sultanate, Adilshah of Bijapur, Qutubshah of Golkonda, Bidarshah of Bidar and Imadshah of Elichpur. These kingdoms often fought with each other. United, they decisively defeated the Vijayanagara Empire of the south in 1565. The present area of Mumbai was ruled by the Sultanate of Gujarat before its capture by Portugal in 1535.
The Faruqi dynasty and Rao Shinde family ruled the Khandesh region between 1382 and 1601 before finally being annexed by the Mughal Empire. The Mughals under Akbar started capturing territories held by the Deccan sultanates towards the end of 16th century. This initiative continued under his successors for almost a century, when most of the present day area of Maharashtra came under Mughal control. However, Mughal control was challenged multiple times during this period. Early in the century the resistance was led by Malik Ambar, the regent of the Nizamshahi dynasty of Ahmednagar from 1607 to 1626. He increased the strength and power of Murtaza Nizam Shah II and raised a large army. Malik Ambar was a proponent of guerilla warfare in the Deccan region and was considered a great foe by Mughal emperor Jehangir. He assisted Mughal prince Khurram (later emperor Shah Jahan) in his struggle against his stepmother, Nur Jahan, who had ambitions to secure the Delhi throne for her son-in-law. In the second half of the 17th century, the Mughals were constantly challenged by the Marathas under Shivaji, and later his successors.
In fact, the decline of Islamic rule in Deccan started when Shivaji annexed a portion of the Bijapur Sultanate in the second half of the 17th century. In the process, he became a symbol of Hindu resistance and self-rule.

Maratha Empire (1674–1818 CE) 

The Maratha Empire dominated the political scene in India from the middle of the 17th century to the early 19th century.

Chhatrapati Shivaji Maharaj

Shivaji was the founder of the modern Maratha empire; his policies were instrumental in forging a distinct identity for the Marathi people. He was born in the Bhonsle clan, sometime in the period 1627 to 1630. Shivaji carved out an enclave from the declining Adilshahi sultanate of Bijapur that formed the genesis of the Maratha Empire. In 1674, he crowned himself as the Chhatrapati (Monarch) of his realm at Raigad Fort. However, to achieve this he not only had to fight the Mughals and the Adilshahi but also many Maratha Watandars. These Watandars considered their watan a source of economic power and pride and were reluctant to part with it. The Watandars even initially opposed the emergence of Shivaji, because their economic interests were affected.
Shivaji was an able administrator and established a government that included such modern concepts as a cabinet (ashtapradhana mandala), foreign affairs (dabir) and internal intelligence. He established an effective civil and military administration, built a powerful navy and erected new forts (e.g. Sindhudurg Fort) and strengthened old ones (e.g. Vijaydurg Fort) on the west coast of Maharashtra. He died around April 3, 1680, of dysentery.

After Shivaji died, Mughal emperor Aurangzeb launched an attack on the Marathas that led to a war lasting 27 years. The death of Aurangzeb in 1707 ended the war and initiated the decline of the Mughal Empire.

Expansion of Maratha Influence in 18th Century under Shahu I and Peshwa rule 

During much of the 18th century, the Peshwas, belonging to the (Bhat) Deshmukh Marathi Chitpavan Brahmin family, controlled the Maratha army and later became the hereditary heads of the Maratha Empire from 1749 to 1818. During their reign, the Maratha empire reached its zenith in 1760, dominating most of the Indian subcontinent. Bajirao I, a prominent Peshwa (general), was only 20 when appointed Peshwa. For his campaigns in North India, he actively promoted young leaders of his own age such as Ranoji Shinde, Malharrao Holkar, the Puar brothers and Pilaji Gaekwad. These leaders also did not come from the traditional aristocratic families of Maharashtra. All the young leaders chosen by Bajirao I or their descendants later became rulers in their own right during the Maratha Confederacy era. Historian K.K. Datta argues that Bajirao I "may very well be regarded as the second founder of the Maratha Empire".

Another general, Raghoji Bhonsle, also expanded the Maratha rule in central and East India and took control of the Nagpur Kingdom. In 1737, the Marathas defeated a Mughal army in their capital, in the Battle of Delhi. The Marathas continued their military campaigns against the Mughals, Nizam, Nawab of Bengal and the Durrani Empire to further extend their boundaries.

By 1760, the domain of the Marathas stretched across most of the Indian subcontinent. The Marathas even discussed abolishing the Mughal throne and placing Peshwa Vishwasrao on the Mughal imperial throne in Delhi. At its peak, the empire stretched from Tamil Nadu in the south, to Peshawar (modern-day Khyber Pakhtunkhwa, Pakistan ) in the north, and Bengal in the east. The Northwestern expansion of the Marathas was stopped after the Third Battle of Panipat (1761). However, the Maratha authority in the north was re-established within a decade under Peshwa Madhavrao I. Under Madhavrao I, the strongest knights were granted semi-autonomy, creating a confederacy of Maratha states led by the Gaekwads of Baroda, the Holkars of Indore and Malwa, the Scindias of Gwalior and Ujjain, the Bhonsales of Nagpur and the Puars of Dhar and Dewas.

In 1775, the East India Company intervened in a Peshwa family succession struggle in Pune, leading to the First Anglo-Maratha War, which resulted in a Maratha victory.

Maratha Navy
Shivaji developed a potent Naval force during his rule. In the early part of the 1700s, under the leadership of Kanhoji Angre, this navy dominated the territorial waters of the western coast of India from Bilimora, Gujarat to Savantwadi. It attacked British, Portuguese, Dutch and Siddi Naval ships and kept a check on their naval ambitions. The Maratha Navy was dominant in the area until around the 1730s, was in a state of decline by the 1770s and ceased to exist by 1818.

Revenue system and Chauth
One of the tools of the empire was collection of Chauth or 25% of the revenue from states that submitted to Maratha power. The Marathas also had an elaborate land revenue system which was retained by the British East India Company when they gained control of Maratha territory.

British colonial period (1818–1947 CE)

Company Rule 

The East India Company controlled Mumbai beginning in the 17th century and used it as one of their main trading posts. The Company slowly expanded areas under its rule during the 18th century. Their conquest of Maharashtra was completed in 1818 with the defeat of Peshwa Bajirao II in the Third Anglo-Maratha War.

British Raj 

The British ruled for more than a century and brought huge changes in every aspect of life for the people of the Maharashtra region. Areas that correspond to present day Maharashtra were under direct or indirect British rule, first under the East India Company and then, from 1858, under the British crown. During this era, Maharashtra region was divided into the Bombay presidency, Berar, Central provinces, Hyderabad state and various Princely states such as Kolhapur and Miraj.

The British Raj saw standardization of Marathi grammar through the efforts of the Christian missionary William Carey. Carey also published the first dictionary of Marathi in devanagari script. The most comprehensive Marathi-English dictionary was compiled by Captain James Thomas Molesworth and Major Thomas Candy in 1831. The book is still in print nearly two centuries after its publication. Molesworth also worked on standardizing Marathi. He used Brahmins of Pune for this task and adopted the Sanskrit-dominated dialect spoken by this caste in the city as the standard dialect for Marathi.

People from Maharashtra played an important part in the social and religious reform movements as well as the nationalist movement of the late 19th and early 20th centuries. Notable Civil society bodies founded by Marathi leaders during 19th century include the Poona Sarvajanik Sabha, the Prarthana Samaj, the Arya Mahila Samaj and the Satya Shodhak Samaj. The Sarvajanik Sabha took an active part in relief efforts during the famine of 1875–76, and is considered the forerunner of the Indian National Congress established in 1885. The most prominent personalities of Indian Nationalism in the late 19th and early 20th century were Gopal Krishna Gokhale and Bal Gangadhar Tilak, who were on opposite sides of the political spectrum, were both from Pune. Tilak was instrumental in using Shivaji and Ganesha worship to forge a collective Maharashtrian identity for Marathi people. The Marathi social reformers of the colonial era include Mahatma Jyotirao Phule, his wife Savitribai Phule, Justice Ranade, feminist Tarabai Shinde, Dhondo Keshav Karve, Vitthal Ramji Shinde and Pandita Ramabai. Jyotirao Phule was a pioneer in opening schools for girls and Marathi dalits castes.

The non-Brahmin Hindu castes of Maharashtra started organizing at the beginning of the 20th century with the blessing of Shahu of Kolhapur. The campaign took off in the early 1920s under the leadership of Keshavrao Jedhe and Baburao Javalkar. Both belonged to the Non-Brahmin party. Their early goals included capturing the Ganpati and Shiv Jayanti festivals from Brahmin domination. They combined nationalism with anti-casteism as the party's aims.

In the 1930s, Jedhe merged the non-Brahmin party with the Congress party, changing it from an upper-caste dominated body to a more broadly based but also Maratha-dominated party. Another notable Marathi figure of the time was B. R. Ambedkar, who led the campaign for the rights of Dalits, a caste that included his own Mahar caste. Ambedkar disagreed with mainstream leaders like Gandhi on issues including untouchability, the government system and the partition of India. He initiated the Dalit Buddhist movement, creating a new school of Buddhism called Navayana, leading to the Dalit movement that still endures. As the nation's first Law and Justice Minister, Ambedkar played a pivotal role in writing the constitution of India and is considered the Father of the Indian Constitution.

The ultimatum in 1942 to the British to Quit India was given in Mumbai and culminated in the transfer of power and the independence of India in 1947. Raosaheb and Achutrao Patwardhan, Nanasaheb Gore, Shreedhar Mahadev Joshi, Yeshwantrao Chavan, Swami Ramanand Bharti, Nana Patil, Dhulappa Navale, V.S. Page, Vasant Patil, Dhondiram Mali, Aruna Asif Ali, Ashfaqulla Khan and several other leaders from Maharashtra played a prominent role in this struggle. B.G. Kher was the first Chief Minister of the tri-lingual Bombay Presidency in 1937.

By the end of the 19th century a modern manufacturing industry was developing in the city of Mumbai. The main product was cotton and the bulk of work force in these cotton mills was from Western Maharashtra, specifically from the coastal Konkan region. The census recorded for the city in the first half of the 20th century showed that nearly half the population of the city listed Marathi as their mother tongue.

Post-Independence

Bombay State 

After India's independence, the Deccan States, including Kolhapur, were integrated into Bombay State, which was created from the former Bombay Presidency in 1950. In 1956, the States Reorganisation Act reorganized the Indian states along linguistic lines, and Bombay State was enlarged by the addition of the predominantly Marathi-speaking regions on Marathwada (Aurangabad Division) from erstwhile Hyderabad state and Vidarbha region from the Central Provinces and Berar. The southernmost part of Bombay State was ceded to Mysore. From 1954 to 1955, the people of Marathi speaking areas strongly protested against being included in the bilingual Bombay state. In response, the Samyukta Maharashtra Movement was formed to fight for a united Maharashtra for the Marathi people. The Mahagujarat Movement also advocated for a separate Gujarat state. Annabhau Sathe, Keshavrao Jedhe, S.M. Joshi, Shripad Amrit Dange, Pralhad Keshav Atre and Gopalrao Khedkar were prominent activists in the campaign to create a separate state of Maharashtra with Mumbai as its capital. On 1 May 1960, following mass protests and 105 deaths, Bombay State was divided into the new states of Maharashtra and Gujarat.

The state continues to have a dispute with Karnataka, to the south, over the regions of Belgaum and Karwar. Some Marathi-majority talukas were also transferred to the Adilabad, Medak, Nizamabad and Mahaboobnagar districts of new Telugu State (now Telangana), to the east of Maharashtra, in 1956.

Since 1960 
The present state of Maharashtra came into being on 1 May 1960 as a Marathi speaking state according to Linguistic state reorganization with Congress party's Yashwantrao Chavan being the first chief minister of the state. The state since its inception has seen huge growth in Industry in a number of areas of the state, increased urbanization, and migration of people from other states of India.

Government and Politics

The Congress party and its allies have ruled the state for the major part during the state's existence. After the brief tenures of Yashwantrao Chavan, who was inducted as defence minister by Prime minister Nehru, and Marotrao Kannamwar, who died after one year in office, Vasantrao Naik was Chief minister from 1963 to 1975. The politics of the state in this period was also dominated by leaders such as Yashwantrao Chavan, Vasantdada Patil, Vasantrao Naik, and Shankarrao Chavan.

Sharad Pawar became a significant personality within the state in 1978 when he broke away from the Congress party to form an alliance government with the Janata party. During his career, Pawar split Congress twice, with significant consequences for state politics. In 1999, after his dispute with the party president Sonia Gandhi over her foreign origins, in 1999, Pawar left the party and formed the Nationalist Congress Party (NCP). The party, however, joined a Congress-led coalition to form the state government after the 1999 Assembly elections.

The Congress party enjoyed a nearly unchallenged dominance of the state political landscape, until 1995 when the coalition of Shiv Sena and the Bharatiya Janata Party (BJP) secured an overwhelming majority in the state, beginning a period of coalition governments. Shiv Sena was the larger party in the coalition. From 1999 until 2014, the NCP and INC formed one coalition while Shiv Sena and the BJP formed another for three successive elections, which the INC-NCP alliance won. Prithviraj Chavan of the Congress party was the last Chief Minister of Maharashtra under the Congress-NCP alliance that ruled until 2014.

The INC during its rule enjoyed overwhelming support from the state's influential sugar co-operatives, as well as thousands of other cooperatives, such as rural agricultural cooperatives involved in the marketing of dairy and vegetable produce, credit unions, etc.

For the better part of its existence, politics of the state was also dominated by the mainly rural Maratha–Kunbi caste, which accounts for 31% of the population of Maharashtra. They dominated the cooperative institutions; and with the resultant economic power, and controlled politics from the village level up to the Assembly and Lok Sabha. Major past political figures of the Congress party from Maharashtra—such as Keshavrao Jedhe, Yashwantrao Chavan, Shankarrao Chavan, Vilasrao Deshmukh, and Sharad Pawar—have been from this group. Of the 18 Chief Ministers so far, as many as 10 (55%) have been Maratha. Since the 1980s, this group has also been active in setting up private educational institutions.

In the 1980s, Shiv Sena and the BJP parties began gaining a foothold in the state especially in the urban areas such as Mumbai. The Shiv Sena was formed in the 1960s by Balashaheb Thackerey, a cartoonist and journalist, to advocate and agitate for the interests of Marathi people in Mumbai. In its early years in the late 1960s, the party specifically targeted immigrants to Mumbai from South India. Over the following decades, the party slowly expanded its base, and took over the then Bombay corporation in the 1980s. The original base of the party was lower middle and working class Marathi people in Mumbai and surrounding urban areas. The leadership of the party came from educated upper caste Maharashtrians. However, since 1990s, strong men have emerged who control their local areas through intimidation and extortion. This has phenomenon has been named "dada-ization"  of the party.
In the early 1990s, some of the party leaders incited violence against Muslims which resulted in riots between Hindus and Muslims. The Shiv Sena and the BJP came into the power at the state level in 1995, which was a big blow to the INC. A split emerged within Shiv Sena when Bal Thackeray anointed his son Uddhav Thackeray as his successor over his nephew Raj Thackeray in 2006. Raj Thackeray then left the party and formed a new party called Maharashtra Navnirman Sena (MNS). Raj Thackeray, like his uncle, also tried to win support from the Marathi community by whipping up anti-immigrant sentiment in Maharashtra, for instance against Biharis and other north Indians.

The BJP is closely related to the Rashtriya Swayamsevak Sangh (RSS), and is part of the Sangh Parivar.In early years, the party originally derived its support from the urban upper castes such as Brahmins and non-Maharashtrians. However, in the 21st century, the party was able to penetrate the Maratha group by fielding Maratha candidates in elections.The RSS was formed in the 1920s in Nagpur by Maharashtrian brahmins, and remains dominated by that community.

Economy
Prior to Indian independence, manufacturing industry in what became Maharashtra was based mainly in the city of Mumbai. After the formation of Maharashtra, the state government established the Maharashtra Industrial Development Corporation (MIDC) in 1962 to spur growth in other areas of the state. In the decades since its formation, MIDC has acted as the primary industrial infrastructure development agency of the government of Maharashtra. Since its inception, MIDC has established at least one industrial area in every district of the state. The areas with biggest industrial growth were the Pune metropolitan region and areas close to Mumbai such as Thane district and Raigad district. After the 1991 economic liberalization, Maharashtra began to attract foreign capital, particularly in the information technology and engineering industries. The late 1990s and first decade of the 21st century saw huge development in the Information Technology sector, and IT Parks were set up in Aundh, and Hinjewadi areas of Pune.

Maharashtra has hundreds of private colleges and universities, including many religious and special-purpose institutions. Most of the private colleges were set up after the State Government of Vasantdada Patil liberalised the Education Sector in 1982. Politicians and leaders involved in the huge cooperative movement in Maharashtra were instrumental in setting up the private institutes

Maharashtra was a pioneer in the development of Agricultural Cooperative Societies after independence. In fact, it was an integral part of the then Governing Congress party's vision of 'rural development with local initiative'. A 'special' status was accorded to the sugar cooperatives and the government assumed the role of a mentor by acting as a stakeholder, guarantor and regulator, Apart from sugar, Cooperatives played a crucial role in dairy, cotton, and fertiliser industries.
Support by the state government led to more than 25,000 cooperatives being set up by 1990s in Maharashtra.

Drought of 1972-73
In 1963, the government of Maharashtra asserted that the agricultural situation in the state was constantly being watched and relief measures were taken as soon as any scarcity was detected. On the basis of this, and asserting that the word famine had now become obsolete in this context, the government passed "The Maharashtra Deletion of the Term 'Famine' Act, 1963". They were unable to foresee the drought in 1972 when 25 million people needed help. The relief measures undertaken by the Government of Maharashtra included employment, programmes aimed at creating productive assets such as tree plantation, conservation of soil, excavation of canals, and building artificial lentic water bodies. The public distribution system distributed food through fair-price shops. No deaths from starvation were reported.

Large scale employment to the deprived sections of Maharashtrian society which attracted considerable amounts of food to Maharashtra. The implementation of the Scarcity Manuals in the state prevented the mortality arising from severe food shortages. The relief works initiated by the government helped employ over 5 million people at the height of the drought in Maharashtra leading to effective famine prevention. The effectiveness of the Maharashtra was also attributable to the direct pressure on the government of Maharashtra by the public who perceived that employment via the relief works programme was their right.  The public protested by marching, picketing, and even rioting.Nevertheless, the measures taken by the government were praised for being a model program for famine relief.

Farmers' suicides 

Since 1990s, there has been a huge increase in number of suicides committed by Farmers in India with Maharashtra accounting for the largest percentage of cases. The main reason cited was their inability to repay loans mostly taken from banks and NBFCs.
Other reasons included the difficulty of farming semi-arid regions, poor agricultural income, absence of alternative income opportunities, and the absence of suitable counselling services. In 2004, the Mumbai High Court commissioned a report from the Tata Institute on the phenomenon. The report cited "government's lack of interest, the absence of a safety net for farmers, and lack of access to information related to agriculture as the chief causes for the desperate condition of farmers in the state."

References

Citations

Bibliography 

 महाराष्ट्राचा गौरवशाली इतिहास / The History of Maharashtra.....
 James Grant Duff, History of the Mahrattas, 3 vols. London, Longmans, Rees, Orme, Brown, and Green (1826). 
 Mahadev Govind Ranade, Rise of the Maratha Power (1900); reprint (1999). 
 Richard Eaton, The new Cambridge history of India,

External links 
 Maharashtra State Past Present & History In Marathi Language
 Maharashtra Government's website

 
Maharashtra